Aparna is a 1981 Indian Malayalam film, directed and produced by C. P. Padmakumar. The film stars Prathap Pothen, Balakrishna Pillai, Jayan and Kanakalatha in the lead roles.

Cast
Prathap Pothen
Balakrishna Pillai
Jayan
Kanakalatha
Master Tony
N. K. Gopalakrishnan
Sudarsna

References

External links
 

1981 films
1980s Malayalam-language films